The List of American and Canadian Graded races is a list of Thoroughbred horse races in the United States and Canada that meet the graded stakes standards maintained by the American Graded Stakes Committee of the Thoroughbred Owners and Breeders Association (TOBA) and the Jockey Club of Canada.  A specific grade level (I, II, III or listed) is then assigned to the race, based on statistical analysis of the quality of the field in previous years, provided the race meets the minimum purse criteria for the grade in question.

The current list is for the previous full 2021 Racing season and the current 2022 Racing season  which is maintained by the International Grading and Race Planning Advisory Committee (IRPAC) of the  Jockey Club.

Due to the COVID-19 pandemic in the United States, the American Graded Stakes Committee lowered the minimum purse required for Grade 1 and Grade 2 stakes for the 2020. The minimum purse for GI has been lowered to $250,000 from $300,000, and the minimum for GII stakes is now $150,000, down from $200,000. The minimum purse for GIII remains at $100,000, and the minimum purse for Listed stakes and grade-eligible stakes remains at $75,000.

Grade 1,2 and 3 races

Click on the sort symbol at the top of the columns to sort on a particular field. Updates and changes for the current 2023 and previous 2022 racing season are noted.
Due to the redevelopment plans at Belmont Park the fall meeting in 2022 was moved to Aqueduct Racetrack.

See also
 Group races, the European equivalent 
 Graded stakes race, the North American equivalent
 List of British flat horse races
 List of Australian Group races
 List of South American Group races
 List of Japanese flat horse races

Notes

References

Horse racing-related lists
Horse racing in the United States
Horse racing in Canada